Hanne-Lore Kuhse (28 March 1925 – 10 December 1999) was a German operatic soprano.

Life and career 

Born in Schwaan, Kuhse first studied singing with a private teacher in Rostock. Later she continued her education at the Rostock Conservatory and at the Stern Conservatory in Berlin.

From 1952 to 1959 she was a member of the Mecklenburg State Theatre. In 1959 she changed to the Leipzig Opera, and in 1963 she was engaged by the Berlin State Opera.

In 1973 she received a visiting professorship at the Hochschule für Musik Franz Liszt, Weimar. In 1974 she was appointed professor at the Musikhochschule Berlin. Her students included mezzo-soprano Annette Markert and baritone Erwin Noack.

Kuhse died in Berlin at age 74.

Repertoire 
She sang almost all roles in dramatic soprano: Donna Anna in Mozart's Don Giovanni, Leonore in Fidelio, Amelia in Un ballo in maschera and Lady Macbeth in Verdi's Macbeth, Puccini's Tosca, Senta in Der fliegende Holländer, Venus in Tannhäuser and Brünnhilde in Der Ring des Nibelungen. The highlight of her artistic activity as a singer was portraying Isolde in Wagner's Tristan und Isolde. In the field of modernity she took over Marie in A. Berg's Wozzeck.

In 1964, she appeared as Lady Macbeth in Verdi's Macbeth, directed by Erich-Alexander Winds at the Staatsoper Unter den Linden.

Trivia 
Kuhse was honorary citizen in Schwaan, where she is buried.

Further reading 
 Karl-Josef Kutsch, Leo Riemens: Großes Sängerlexikon. Third extended edition. K. G. Saur, Munich 1999. Volume 3: Hirata-Möwes, .

References

External links 
 
 
 

1925 births
1999 deaths
Musicians from Mecklenburg-Western Pomerania
German operatic sopranos
Academic staff of the Berlin University of the Arts
Recipients of the Patriotic Order of Merit in silver